The Provincial Highways of Gilgit-Baltistan consists of all public highways maintained by Gilgit-Baltistan, Pakistan. These are not to be confused with national highways which are federal roads maintained by the Government of Pakistan and the National Highway Authority.

List of Provincial Highways

See also
 Motorways of Pakistan
 National Highways of Pakistan
 Transport in Pakistan
 National Highway Authority

References

External links 
 GBHD

Roads in Gilgit-Baltistan
Lists of roads in Pakistan